Magistrates of Brussels was a 1634-5 oil painting by Anthony van Dyck.  It was destroyed in the French bombardment of Brussels in 1695.  Its composition is known from a grisaille sketch in the École nationale supérieure des Beaux-Arts in Paris, which Van Dyck prepared to show how he planned to lay out the work.

Van Dyck was paid 2,400 florins for the painting in 1628, intended for Brussels Town Hall.  It was painted in a period when Van Dyck had returned to the Netherlands.  The work was completed in 1634-5 and included portraits of seven magistrates in council, around a statue representing Justice.

At least four sketches of magistrates' heads for the same work are known to exist, each with a distinctive pink background. Two are in the Ashmolean Museum at Oxford.  A third was in the collection of the Saint Louis Art Museum from 1952 to 2010, and later sold to a private collector.  A fourth (Magistrate of Brussels) was rediscovered in England in 2013.  A further work in the Royal Collection may also be from the same series.

References
A Study for the Head of a Magistrate of Brussels, Artnet
 Masters of the loaded brush: oil sketches from Rubens to Tiepolo, p. 75-76

External links
 Sir Anthony van Dyck (1599 - 1641): Head of a bearded Man wearing a Wheel Ruff, Ashmolean
 Sir Anthony van Dyck (1599 - 1641): Head of a bearded Man wearing a Falling Ruff, Ashmolean
 A Study for the Head of a Magistrate of Brussels, Fergus Hall
 
 New Van Dyck discovery, Art History News, 5 January 2014
 A new Van Dyck discovery at the Royal Collection, Art History News, 15 May 2013

Portraits by Anthony van Dyck
1630s paintings
Lost paintings